Weisner may refer to:
 Weisner's method, a mathematical method for finding generating functions for special functions using representation theory of Lie
 Magic Weisner (foaled 1999), an American Thoroughbred racehorse

 People
 Jamie Weisner (born 1994), American–Canadian basketball player
 Louis Weisner (1899–1988), an American-Canadian mathematician at the University of New Brunswick who introduced Weisner's method
 Maurice F. Weisner (1917-2006), a United States Navy four-star admiral
 Melanie Weisner (born 1986), an American professional poker player
 Pat Weisner (born 1982), an Australian rugby league player
 Tom Weisner (born c. 1949), an American politician

See also
 Wizner, an Americanized version